Tom Bogs (born 21 November 1944) is a retired Danish middleweight boxer.

Bogs was born to Poul Bogs, the 1947-1950 Danish champion in shot put. His younger sister Maibritt held the national title in the discus throw, yet Bogs turned to boxing and competed at the 1964 Summer Olympics in the light-middleweight division. He reached the quarter-finals, where he lost to Nojim Maiyegun of Nigeria. Bogs turned professional shortly after the games and was active during the 1960s and 1970s, building up an unbeaten record of 53 wins and one draw. He suffered his first defeat against the former world welterweight and middleweight champion Emile Griffith in a non-title fight in June 1970.

Bogs won the European light-heavyweight title in 1968 when he stopped German champion Lothar Stengel in the first round of the bout. He successfully defended the title against Piero Del Papa before moving down to the middleweight division for a title match against European champion Carlos Duran. Bogs defeated Duran and went on to successfully defend his middleweight title three times before losing a rematch to Duran in 1970.

In 1972 he earned a title shot against reigning world middleweight champion Carlos Monzón. Bogs was stopped in five rounds. Bogs later moved back up to the light-heavyweight division and notched wins over contenders Vicente Rondon and Mike Quarry. He lost to John Conteh in a bid to regain the European light-heavyweight title, and retired from boxing in 1974.

1964 Olympic results
Below is the record of Tom Bogs, a Danish light middleweight boxer who competed at the 1964 Tokyo Olympics:

 Round of 32: bye
 Round of 16: defeated Chen Bai Sun (Republic of China) referee stopped contest
 Quarterfinal: lost to Nojim Maiyegun (Nigeria) referee stopped contest

References

1944 births
Sportspeople from Copenhagen
Light-heavyweight boxers
Middleweight boxers
Boxers at the 1964 Summer Olympics
Olympic boxers of Denmark
Living people
Danish male boxers